Stephen Blum (born March 4, 1942) is an American scholar and musician, whose research has primarily been in ethnomusicology.  He has lent a multidisciplinary approach to the writing and publication of numerous articles discussing a wide range of musical topics and ideas.

Blum's writing displays a strong knowledge of parallel disciplines through the thoughtful inclusion of academic theory from the fields of sociology, historical musicology, philosophy, anthropology, composition and analysis. Through his continued participation and critiques, he has made numerous contributions to the dialogue surrounding the fields of ethnomusicology and musicology.

Biography

Blum received a bachelor's degree from Oberlin College in 1964,and then a PhD in music at the University of Illinois at Urbana–Champaign. As a PhD student, Blum worked with music scholars including Alexander Ringer, Charles Hamm, and Bruno Nettl.  His first publications were co-authored with Nettl, a pioneering historical musicologist and ethnomusicologist, and supervising his dissertation, Musics in Contact: The Cultivation of Oral Repertoires in Meshed Iran, University of Illinois at Urbana–Champaign, 1972.

Blum was to later co-edit the 1991 festschrift for Nettl, Ethnomusicology and Modern Music History, along with  former Nettl students Philip Bohlman and Daniel M. Neuman.

Academic appointments

Blum’s teaching career began at Western Illinois University (1967–73), followed by an assistant professorship at University of Illinois at Urbana–Champaign until 1977. He then moved to Toronto's York University, where he remained for ten years, founding the MFA program "Music and Contemporary Cultures", the first of its kind Canada. In 1987 he founded the ethnomusicology program at City University of New York Graduate Center, where he worked until his retirement in 2016.

Scholarship and legacy 

Blum's ethnographic focus on northeastern Iran in his PhD dissertation led to a number of published articles early in his career discussing the folksinging traditions of these regions. His final observations were not just theoretical, but took into consideration the racial and classist attitudes among his informants, the implications of which are included in his ethnographic work. In "The Concept of the ‘Asheq in Northern Khorasan" (1972) Blum presents part of his fieldwork undertaken in 1969 for his dissertation but pointedly focuses on social folk music of the (primarily) Kurdish minority. In 1974, his article, "Persian Folksong in Meshhed (Iran)", Blum continued a detailed rhythmic and melodic analysis of ten folk songs while focusing on informant-perceived rural and urban difference in style and performance. He observed that a lack of singing and dancing in Iranian society is not linked to a rural and urban divide but is a privation of poverty. He noted,

With Ameneh Youssefzadeh, Blum is the consulting editor in music for Encyclopædia Iranica. He is also the author of a number of entries in The New Grove Dictionary of Music and Musicians and has contributed to the three volumes of the Garland Encyclopedia of World Music devoted to the United States and Canada, the Middle East, and Europe.

Blum often returned to his Western roots, a prominent example being an article on the writing and music of Charles Ives published in 1977 in The Musical Quarterly. He discusses and analyzes Ives’ music through his writing, tackling the motivations and perceptions of a stubborn and controversial artist, concluding that Ives’  "musical techniques aimed to explore 'processes of musical differentiation' in relationships of sounds, with reference to their social and moral contexts." He has often tackled theoretical issues in musicology, ethnomusicology.

The field recordings from his research trips to Iran were donated to Harvard University, where they have been digitized and posted publicly online as the Stephen Blum Collection of Music from Iranian Khorāsān. In 1995, Blum donated copies of this collection to Iran's Ministry of Islamic Culture and Guidance.

Publications
 "Meter and Rhythm in the Sung Poetry of Iranian Khorasan," in Thought and Play in Musical Rhythm, ed. Richard Wolf, Stephen Blum, and Christopher Hasty, Oxford, 2020, 75-99.
 "The Terminology of Vocal Performance in Iranian Khorasan," in Theory and Practice in the Music of the Islamic World: Essays in Honour of Owen Wright, Ashgate, Aldershot, 2017.
 "Ethnomusicologists and Questions of Temporality," in Music in Time: Phenomenology, Perception, Performance, ed. Suzanna Clark and Alexander Rehding. Cambridge: Harvard University Department of Music, 2016, 55–67.
 “Foundations of Musical Knowledge in the Muslim World,” in The Cambridge History of World Music, ed. Philip V. Bohlman. Cambridge: Cambridge University Press, 2013, 103–24.
 “Classical Aesthetic Traditions of India, China, and the Middle East” (with Peter Manuel), in The Routledge Companion to Philosophy and Music, ed. Theodore Gracyk and Andrew Kania, 2011, 245–56.
 “A Society and its Journal: Stories of Hybridity,” Asian Music XLII/1 (2011), 3–23.
 “Karnā,” Encyclopaedia Iranica, XV, fasc. 6 (2011), and on website, iranica.com.
 “Musical Enactment of Attitudes toward Conflict in the USA,” in Music and Conflict: Ethnomusicological Perspectives, ed. John Morgan O’Connell and Salwa El-Shawan Castelo-Branco. Urbana: University of Illinois Press, 2010, 232–42.
 “Kamānča,” Encyclopaedia Iranica,  XV, fasc. 4 (2010), 434–37, and on website, iranica.com.
 “Modes of Theorizing in Iranian Khorasan,” in Theorizing the Local: Music, Practice, and Experience in South Asia and Beyond, ed. Richard K. Wolf. New York: Oxford University Press, 2009, 207–24.
 “Representations of Music Making,” in Musical Improvisation: Art, Education, and Society, ed. Gabriel Solis and Bruno Nettl. Urbana: University of Illinois Press, 2009, pp. 239–62.
 “Remembering Warriors in Song,” in Musical Culture and Memory (Musicological Studies: Proceedings, no. 2), ed. Tatjana Marković and Vesna Mikić. Belgrade: Department of Musicology, Faculty of Music, University of Arts, 2008: 273–280.
 “Avāz,” Encyclopedia of Islam, third edition, Leiden: Brill, 2007/2: 182–83
 “‘Abd al-Qādir al-Marāghī,” Encyclopedia of Islam, third edition, 2007/3:21.
 “‘Abdallāh, Mīrzā” Encyclopedia of Islam, third edition, 2007/3: 23.
 “Navā’i, a Musical Genre of Northeastern Iran,” in Analytical Studies in World Music, ed. Michael Tenzer. New York: Oxford University Press, 2006, 41–57.
 “Compelling Reasons to Sing: the Music of Ta‘ziye,” TDR /the journal of performance studies, XLIX/4 [no. T188] ( 2005), 86–90. Reprinted in Eternal Performance: Ta‘ziyeh and Other Shiite Rituals, ed. Peter J. Chelkowski and Richard Schechner (Seagull Books, 2010), 170–77.
 “The Art of the Khorasani Baxşi,” Folklor ve Etnoqrafiya (Baku), 1 (2004), 11–16.
 “L’acte musicale: éléments d’analyse,” L’Homme, Revue Française d'Anthropologie, no. 171-172 (2004), 231–247.
 “Some Questions That Concern Ethnomusicologists,” Musiqi dunyasi (Baku), 2004/1-2.
 “Kurtág’s Articulation of Kafka's Rhythms (Kafka-Fragmenta, op. 24),” Studia Musicologica Academiae Scientiarum Hungaricae, XLIII/3-4 (2002), 121–34. French translation, “L’articulation des rythmes de Kafka selon Kurtág (Fragments de Kafka op. 24),” in Ligatures: La pensée musicale de György Kurtág, ed. Pierre Maréchaux and Grégoire Tosser (Rennes: Presses Universitaires de Rennes, 2009), 177–91.
 “Hearing the Music of the Middle East,” The Garland Encyclopedia of World Music, Vol. VI, The Middle East, ed. Virginia Danielson, Scott Marcus, and Dwight Reynolds. New York: Garland,  2002, pp. 3–13. Abridged in The Concise Garland Encyclopedia of World Music 2: 767–70.
 “Iran: an Introduction,” The Garland Encyclopedia of World Music, Vol. VI, The Middle East, The Middle East, ed. Virginia Danielson, Scott Marcus, and Dwight Reynolds. New York: Garland,  2002, 823–838.
 Biographical articles on six Kurdish musicians (with Amir Hassanpour): “Kamkars,” “Kurdistani, Sayid Ali Asghar,” “Mamili, Mihammad,” “Miryam Khan,” “Perwer, Şivan,” and “Razzazi, Nasir.” The New Grove Dictionary of Music and Musicians, 2nd edition, ed. Stanley Sadie and John Tyrrell. London and New York: Macmillan, 2nd ed., 2001, Vols. XIII, p. 343; XIV, pp. 41–2; XV, p. 718; XVI, p. 752; XIX, p. 477; XX, 890.
 “Central Asia,” The New Grove Dictionary of Music and Musicians, 2nd edition, ed. Stanley Sadie and John Tyrrell. London and New York: Macmillan, 2001, Vol. V, 363-72.
 “Composition,” The New Grove Dictionary of Music and Musicians, 2nd edition, ed. Stanley Sadie and John Tyrrell. London and New York: Macmillan, 2001, Vol. VI, 186–201.
 “Iran, Folk Music,” The New Grove Dictionary of Music and Musicians, 2nd edition, ed. Stanley Sadie and John Tyrrell. London and New York: Macmillan, 2001, Vol. IX, 300-09.
 “Iran, III. Regional and Popular Traditions,” The New Grove Dictionary of Music and Musicians, 2nd edition, ed. Stanley Sadie and John Tyrrell. London and New York: Macmillan, 2001, Vol. XII, 537-46.
 “Kurdish Music” (with Dieter Christensen), The New Grove Dictionary of Music and Musicians, 2nd edition, ed. Stanley Sadie and John Tyrrell. London and New York: Macmillan, 2001, Vol. XIV, 36–41.
 “Repertory”(with Ian Bent), The New Grove Dictionary of Music and Musicians, 2nd edition, ed. Stanley Sadie and John Tyrrell. London and New York: Macmillan, 2001, Vol. XXI, 196-98.
 “Sources, Scholarship and Historiography,” The Garland Encyclopedia of World Music, Vol. III, The United States and Canada, ed. Ellen Koskoff. New York: Garland, 2001, 21–37.
 “Local Knowledge of Musical Genres and Roles,” The Garland Encyclopedia of World Music, Vol. VIII, Europe, ed. James Porter and Timothy F. Rice. New York: Garland, 2000, 112–26.
 “Recognizing Improvisation,” in In the Course of Performance: Studies in the World of Musical Improvisation, ed. Bruno Nettl with Melinda Russell. Chicago: University of Chicago Press, 1998, 27–45.
 “Musical Questions and Answers in Iranian Xorāsān,” EM: Annuario degli Archivi di Etnomusicologia dell'Accademia Nazionale di Santa Cecilia, IV (1996), 145–63. Italian translation, “Domande e risposte musicali nel Xorāsān iranienne,” in Incontri di etnomusicologia: seminari e conferenza in ricordo di Diego Carpitella, ed. Giovanni Giuriati, Rome: Accademia Nazionale di Santa Cecilia, 2007, 215–34.
 “‘The Morning of Freedom Rose Up’: Kurdish Popular Song and the Exigencies of Cultural Survival” (with Amir Hassanpour), Popular Music, XV/3 (1996), 325–43. Reprinted in Non-Western Popular Music (The Library of Essays on Popular Music), ed. Tony Langlois (Farnham: Ashgate, 2012), 77–95. Turkish translation, “Kürt Halk Şarkısı ve Kültürel Kalıtımın Zorunlulukları,” in Kürt müziği, dansları ve şarıkları / Müzik, dans u şarqiyen kurd, ed. Mehmet Bayrak (Kızılay/Ankara: Özge, 2002), 1: 366–84.
 “Do-baytī,” in Encyclopædia Iranica, ed. Ehsan Yarshater, Vol. VII, fasc. 5 (1995), pp. 451–2.
 “Conclusion: Music in the Age of Cultural Confrontation.” in Music-Cultures in Contact: Convergences and Collisions, ed. Margaret J. Kartomi and Stephen Blum,  Sydney: Currency Press (Australian Studies in the History, Philosophy, and Social Studies of Music, 2) and Basel: Gordon & Breach (Musicology: A Book Series, 16), 1994, 250–77.
 “In Defense of Close Reading and Close Listening.” Symposium on “Approaches to the Discipline,” Current Musicology, no. 53 (1993), 41–54.
 “Analysis of Musical Style,” in Ethnomusicology: An Introduction, ed. Helen Myers. New York: Norton and London: Macmillan, 1992 (Norton/Grove Handbooks in Music),165–218. Korean translation by Bag Mi-gyeong, Eum’ag gwa munhwa / Music and Culture 16 (2007), 183–228.
 “European Musical Terminology and the Music of Africa,” in Comparative Musicology and Anthropology of Music: Essays in the History of Ethnomusicology, ed. Bruno Nettl and Philip V. Bohlman. Chicago: The University of Chicago Press, 1991,1–36.
 “Prologue: Ethnomusicologists and Modern Music History.” in Ethnomusicology and Modern Music History, ed. Stephen Blum, Philip V. Bohlman, and Daniel M. Neuman. Urbana: University of Illinois Press, 1991, 1–20. Chinese translation, People’s Music Publishing House, 2009.
 Commentary for Symposium, “The Representation of Musical Practice and the Practice of Representation,” Ethnomusicology, XXXIV (1990), 413–21.
 “Music History,” in International Encyclopedia of Communications, ed. Erik Barnouw. New York: Oxford University Press, 1989, Vol. III, 104-11.
 “On the Disciplines and Arts of Music,” The World of Music, XXIX/1 (1987), 19–32.
 "The Fuging Tune in British North America," in Sing Out the Glad News: Hymn Tunes in Canada. Proceedings of the Conference held in Toronto February 7 and 8, 1986, ed. John Beckwith. Toronto: Institute for Canadian Music, 1987: 119–48.
 “Ethnomusicologists vis-à-vis the Fallacies of Contemporary Musical Life,” Pacific Review of Ethnomusicology, III (1986), 1–19 (responses by 11 scholars, pp. 20–41).
 “Rousseau’s Concept of Sistême musical and the Comparative Study of Tonalities in Nineteenth-Century France,” Journal of the American Musicological Society, XXXVIII (1985), 349–61.
 “Changing Roles of Performers in Meshhed and Bojnurd, Iran,” in Eight Urban Musical Cultures, ed. Bruno Nettl. Urbana: University of Illinois Press, 1978, 19–95.
 “An Ethnomusicologist’s Reflections on ‘Complexity’ and ‘Participation’ in Music,” College Music Symposium, XVII/2 (1977), 25–41.
 “Ives’s Position in Social and Musical History,” The Musical Quarterly, LXIII (1977), 459–82.
 “Towards a Social History of Musicological Technique,” Ethnomusicology, XIX (1975), 207–31.
 “Persian Folksong in Meshhed (Iran), 1969,” Yearbook of the International Folk Music Council, VI (1974), 86–114. Persian translation, “Tarāne-ye mardomi dar Mašhad, 1969,” Mahoor Music Quarterly X/39 (2008), 7–38.
 “The Concept of the 'Asheq in Northern Khorasan,” Asian Music IV/1 (1972), 27–47. Turkish translation, “Kuzey Horasan’da ‘Ašık’ kavramı” in Kürt müziği, dansları ve şarıkları / Mûzik, dans û şarqîyên kurdî, ed. Mehmet Bayrak (Kızılay/Ankara: Özge, 2002), 1: 515–32.  Persian version, with corrections, “Mahfum-e ‘āšeq dar farhang-e musiq’i-ye šomāl-e Xorāsān,” Mahoor Music Quarterly, IV/17 (2002), 9–29.

See also 
 Persian traditional music
 Iranian folk music

References

External links
The Stephen Blum Collection of Music from Iranian Khorāsān at Harvard University: original ethnographic sound recordings, 1968–2006. A Finding Aid
 Profile at CUNY Graduate Center
 Academia.edu
 Symposium in honor of Professor Stephen Blum
Stephen Blum Collection of Music from Iranian Khorāsān at Harvard University Loeb Music Library

1942 births
Living people
City University of New York faculty
American musicologists
University of Illinois at Urbana–Champaign School of Music alumni
People from East Cleveland, Ohio
Ethnomusicologists